Alexis (Alexis Carl Ernst Louis Ferdinand Eugen Bernhard; 17 November 1845 – 21 January 1919) was a lieutenant general, statesman, and the Prince of Bentheim and Steinfurt from 28 September 1890 to 21 January 1919.

Biography

Early life
Alexis was born in Burgsteinfurt, Kingdom of Prussia on 17 November 1845 and was the fourth child and eldest son of Ludwig Wilhelm, Prince of Bentheim and Steinfurt (1812–1890) and his wife Landgravine Bertha of Hesse-Philippsthal-Barchfeld (1818–1888).

Alexis was a brother of Adelheid, Landgravine Wilhelm of Hesse-Philippsthal-Barchfeld (1840–1880), Juliane, Landgravine Wilhelm of Hesse-Philippsthal-Barchfeld (1842–1878), Marie, Princess of Sayn-Wittgenstein-Hohenstein (1843–1931), Prince Karl of Bentheim and Steinfurt (1848–1854), and Prince Georg of Bentheim and Steinfurt (1851–1939).

Education and military career
Alexis attended high school in Burgsteinfurt and attended university at the University of Bonn, where he was a member of the Corps Borussia Bonn. In 1866, Alexis was a lieutenant in the Hanoverian Guards Hussars Regiment and in 1868, he was transferred to the Hussars Regiment No. 7. 

In 1873, he advanced to first lieutenant and then to Rittmeister in the Regiment der Gardes du Corps in 1875. In 1884, Alexis advanced to major à la suite in the army. In 1892 Alexis was made lieutenant colonel, then colonel in 1895, and major general in 1899. In 1902, he was awarded the uniform of the Regiment der Garde du Corps Lieutenant General.

Political career
Alexis succeeded his father Ludwig Wilhelm to the headship of the Princely House of Bentheim and Steinfurt. As such, he became a hereditary member of the Prussian House of Lords and the Württembergian Chamber of Lords.

Honours
He received the following orders and decorations:

Marriage and issue
Alexis married Princess Pauline of Waldeck and Pyrmont, second child and daughter of George Victor, Prince of Waldeck and Pyrmont and his first wife Princess Helena of Nassau, on 7 May 1881 in Arolsen, Principality of Waldeck and Pyrmont. Alexis and Pauline had eight children:

Prince Eberwyn of Bentheim and Steinfurt (10 April 1882 – 31 July 1949)
 ∞ 1906–1914 Pauline Langenfeld (1884–1970)
 ∞ 1918–1919 Ellen Bischoff-Korthaus (1894–1936), who later remarried Adolf II, Prince of Schaumburg-Lippe
 ∞ 1920 Anne-Louise Husser (1891–1951)
Viktor Adolf, Prince of Bentheim and Steinfurt (18 July 1883 – 4 June 1961)
 ∞ 1920 Princess Stephanie of Schaumburg-Lippe (1899–1925), daughter of Princess Louise of Denmark.
 ∞ 1931 Princess Rosa Helene of Solms-Hohensolms-Lich (1901–1963)
Prince Karl Georg of Bentheim and Steinfurt (10 December 1884 – 14 February 1951)
 ∞ 1914 Princess Margarete of Schönaich-Carolath (1888–1980)
Princess Elisabeth of Bentheim and Steinfurt (12 July 1886 – 8 May 1959)
Princess Viktoria of Bentheim and Steinfurt (18 August 1887 – 30 January 1961)
Princess Emma of Bentheim and Steinfurt (19 February 1889 – 25 April 1905)
Prince Alexis Rainer of Bentheim and Steinfurt (16 December 1891 – 30 June 1923)
Prince Friedrich of Bentheim and Steinfurt (27 May 1894 – 17 May 1981)
 ∞ 1934 Louise von Gülich (1893-1949)

Ancestry

References

Bibliography 
 Hermann A. L. Degener: Wer ist's?, V, Leipzig 1911, S. 89

House of Bentheim and Steinfurt
Princes of Bentheim and Steinfurt
1845 births
1919 deaths
People from the Kingdom of Hanover
People from Steinfurt
Members of the Württembergian Chamber of Lords
Members of the Prussian House of Lords
Lieutenant generals of Prussia
University of Bonn alumni
Recipients of the Iron Cross, 2nd class
Recipients of the Order of the Netherlands Lion
Commanders Grand Cross of the Order of the Polar Star
Honorary Knights Grand Cross of the Royal Victorian Order